U-17 may refer to one of the following German submarines:

 , was the lead ship of the Type U 17 class of submarines; launched in 1912 and served in the First World War until stricken on 27 January 1919
 During the First World War, Germany also had these submarines with similar names:
 , a Type UB I submarine launched in 1915 that disappeared in March 1918
 , a Type UC II submarine launched in 1916 and surrendered 26 November 1918
 , a Type IIB submarine that served in the Second World War and was scuttled on 5 May 1945
 , a Type 206 submarine of the Bundesmarine that was launched in 1973 and still in service

U-17 or U-XVII may also refer to:
 , a U-10 class submarine of the Austro-Hungarian Navy

Submarines of Germany